Brønnøysund Musikkorps (BMK) (founded in autumn of 1894) is a wind band in Brønnøysund, Norway, with approx. 50 members.
The BMK slogan is Korps for folk (Band for people).

Conductor is Hans Kristian Edvardsen.

Projects
The band is particularly known for its Torghattfestivalen named after the famous mountain Torghatten with a visible hole all through. This wind band festival is arranged in June every second year (next in June 2019).

The band participates regularly in the celebrations on 1 and 17 May, and in the ceremony of the Christmas tree lighting on Advent Sunday.
In addition to these regular traditions, the band has launched a number of projects cooperating with soloist singers and musicians, choirs and other bands. Below is the list of recent projects:
 Travel to Italy in 2018, with headquarter in Vicchio, and invited and in cooperation with the street band Funk Off, performing concerts same place, plus in Firenze and in Torrita di Siena.
 Travel to Spain in 2016, headquartered i Calella, with concerts near the Montserrat monastery, at the plaza of Pineda de Mar and in the Barcelona Cathedral
 Rat Pack - Three concerts in 2015 based on music for Dean Martin, Sammy Davis jr. and Frank Sinatra. Spring concerts in Brønnøysund and at Vega plus the Torghattfestivalen of 2015.
 Travel to Italy in 2014 performing concerts in Vicchio and  based on a cooperation with Dario Cecchini and his «street band» Funk Off plus the wind band Banda di Vicchio.
 Fields of Gold - A tribute concert to Phil Collins, Paul Simon, Peter Gabriel, and Sting in 2013. Two spring concerts in Brønnøysund and Vega plus concert at the Torghattfestivalen 2013.
 Hits from the 80s - a Torghattfestivalen 2011 anniversary concert in retrospect to the popular music at the time of the first festival.
 Verden i Brønnøy ("The world in Brønnøy") - world music concert in 2009 together with artist from Senegal, Mexico, Sweden and Norway. Performance of African songs and music, Spanish guitar with flamenco dancing, sami yoik, Mexican singing and percussion. The concert was an integral part of the Torghattfestivalen 2009.
 ¡Escucha! - en latinamerikansk reise ("Latin-american travel") with artist from Latin America and Canada, concert at the Torghattfestivalen 2007.
 Minnenas Hotell ("Hotel of memories") - Gunnar Pedersen with friends, concert November 2006: Åge Aleksandersen, Elisabeth Moberg, Thomas Brøndbo.
 Musical concert April 2006.
 Jonas Knutsson kvartett - August 2005
 Lipstick - fra rockens barndom ("from rock childhood") - Autumn 2004 and Torghattfestivalen 2005.
 Änglar ("Angels") - Spring 2004.
 Total Balalaika - Spring 2003.
 På loffen i Astrid Lindgrens verden ("Vagabonding in the world of Astrid Lindgren") - Autumn 2001.
 James Bond - Autumn 2000..
 Lipstick on Your Collar - Autumn 1999

Church concerts

For some years BMK performed church concerts every November in Brønnøy church. The repertoire was selected from the classical "literature", mixed with Christmas music, as a warm-up to the imminent advent. Some of the concert pieces were accompanied by the (at the time) new church organ.

Repertoire of 2009:
 Fanfare for Canterbury Cathedral (David Sampson) - Organ: Elena Ebbesen
 Hos Gud er Idel Glede ("With God there is mere joy") (Folk music from Selbu, Norway)
 Pelle på Molnet ("Pelle on the cloud") (Jonas Knutsson) - Clarinet soloist: Rolf Arve Wold
 Canon (Johann Pachelbel)
 Dies Irae from Requiem (Giuseppe Verdi)
 Rennessance suite (Various composers)
 Carmen (excerpts) (Georges Bizet)
 Funeral March (Frédéric Chopin)
 Second Concerto for Clarinet (Carl Maria von Weber) - Clarinet soloist: Bera Skorpen
 Toccata & Fugue in D minor (Johann Sebastian Bach) - Organ soloist: Elena Ebbesen
 Theme from Schindler's List (John Williams) - Clarinet soloist: Rolf Arve Wold
 Peludium from Te Deum (Marc-Antoine Charpentier) - Organ: Elena Ebbesen
 Jesu, Joy of Man's Desiring (Johann Sebastian Bach) - Organ: Elena Ebbesen
 Pavane, op. 50 (Gabriel Fauré)
 Deilig er Jorden ("Schönster Herr Jesu") (Silesian folk music / arr. Bernhard Severin Ingemann)

Band house

The band has a building of its own, called the BMK barrack, used for exercises and social events.

External links
BMK home page (Norwegian)
YouTube: Fields of Gold - Concert at Vega, April 2013

Brønnøy
Norwegian musical groups
Marching bands